Colpo is a commune in the Morbihan department of the region of Brittany in north-western France.

Demographics
Inhabitants of Colpo are called Colpéens.

Map

See also
Communes of the Morbihan department

References

External links

Mayors of Morbihan Association 

Communes of Morbihan